Impotenti esistenziali is a 2009 Italian comedy film written and directed by Giuseppe Cirillo and starring  Tinto Brass, Sandra Milo and Alvaro Vitali.

Plot

Giuseppe, psychologist and professor of sex education, thinks to be the punisher of society against hypocrisy. A day, in a private club, he meets Francesca, Riccardo's wife, and has a relationship with her.

Cast 

 Giuseppe Cirillo: Giuseppe
 Antonella Ponziani: Francesca
 Tinto Brass: De Fortis
 Alvaro Vitali: Amilcare
 Sandra Milo: aunt Elisabetta
 Don Backy: father Giovanni
 Angela Melillo: Angela
 Gianni Nazzaro: manager Riccardo

See also   
 List of Italian films of 2009

External links

2009 romantic comedy films
2009 films
Italian romantic comedy films
2000s Italian-language films
2000s Italian films